Mansoor Ateeg Al-Sobhi Al-Harbi (born 19 October 1987) is a Saudi Arabian professional footballer who plays as a defender former the Saudi Arabia national team.

Club career
Mansoor Al-Harbi played left back for Al-Ahli from 2004 until 2018. He helped Al-Ahli win multiple titles including the 2015–16 Saudi Professional League and the 2016 King Cup.

Mansoor joined Al-Ittihad on 26 July 2018 with 3 years contract

International career

2012 Arab Nations Cup
Mansoor made his debut for the Saudi Arabia national football team in the 2012 Arab Nations Cup, helping the side reach the semi-finals where suffered a 2–0 defeat to Libya. Also Saudi Arabia lost to Iraq by Third place.

2013 Gulf Cup of Nations
Al-Harbi began the Gulf Cup 2013, in the group stage they lost first match against Iraq, they lost three points scored 0 goals to 2. the next match against Yemen and they won by collect three points scored 2 goals out of 0, he was also selected as man of the match.

2018 World Cup
In June 2018 he was named in Saudi Arabia’s squad for the 2018 World Cup in Russia.

Career statistics

Club

International
Statistics accurate as of match played 14 June 2018.

International goals

Honours

Club
 Al-Ahli
Kings Cup: 2011, 2012, 2016.
Saudi Crown Prince Cup: 2014–15
Saudi Professional League: 2015–16
Saudi Super Cup: 2016
GCC Champions League: 2008

Individual
Gulf Cup 2013 Man Of The Match vs. Yemen.

References

1987 births
Living people
Saudi Arabian footballers
Al-Ahli Saudi FC players
Ittihad FC players
Al-Raed FC players
Sportspeople from Jeddah
Saudi Arabia international footballers
Saudi Professional League players
Association football fullbacks
2018 FIFA World Cup players